The Ngundjan (Ogh-Undjan) were an indigenous Australian people of the state of Queensland.

Language
The Ngundjan spoke a dialect variety of Kunjen.

Country
Their inland extension went to Dunbar and southwards as far as Emu Creek and the Red River.

Alternative names
 Kun'djan
 Kundjan
 Gundjun
 Koko Kuntjan
 Kundjin
 Kokoyan
 Koonjan
 Kunjen, Kunjin
 Okundjain
 Koko wansin. (?)

Notes

Citations

Sources

Aboriginal peoples of Queensland